Beijing Institute of Technology Gymnasium is a 5,000-seat indoor arena located on the campus of Beijing Institute of Technology in Beijing, China. It hosted volleyball competitions at the 2008 Summer Olympics and the goalball competition at the 2008 Summer Paralympics.

References
Beijing2008.cn profile

Venues of the 2008 Summer Olympics
Sports venues in Beijing
University sports venues in China
Indoor arenas in China
Volleyball venues in China
Olympic volleyball venues
Sports venues completed in 2008
2008 establishments in China